Coleridge Bernard "C. J." Stroud IV (born October 3, 2001) is an American football quarterback for the Ohio State Buckeyes. He holds many Ohio State records, including most passing yards in a single game with 573 as well as being the first player to throw for six touchdowns three times. Stroud was a Heisman Trophy finalist in 2021 and 2022.

Early years
Stroud was born on October 3, 2001, in Rancho Cucamonga, California, the youngest of four children. His father has been incarcerated since Stroud was in middle school. Stroud attended Rancho Cucamonga High School As a senior, he was the Inland Valley Daily Bulletin offensive player of the year after passing for 3,878 yards and 47 touchdowns. In 2019, he was the MVP of the Elite 11. Stroud was selected to play in the 2020 All-American Bowl. Initially considered a 3-star recruit, Stroud would finish high school as the third-highest rated quarterback of his class. He committed to Ohio State University to play college football.

College career

2020

Stroud spent his true freshman year at Ohio State redshirting as a backup to Justin Fields. He played just one total snap in 2020; he scored a 48-yard rushing touchdown.

2021

Stroud was named the starting quarterback as a redshirt-freshman following the departure of Fields to the 2021 NFL Draft. He was chosen over freshmen Kyle McCord, Quinn Ewers, and fellow redshirt-freshman Jack Miller III. Coach Ryan Day credited his decision-making, leadership skills, and accuracy as the reasons that he earned the starting spot.

Stroud started every game for the Buckeyes aside from a Week 2 game against Akron in order to rest a shoulder injury he sustained in the season opener. Over the season, he earned first team All-Big Ten Honors; was named the Big 10 quarterback of the year; won Big Ten Freshman of the Week six times; was a finalist for both the Davey O'Brien Award and the Heisman Trophy (losing both to Bryce Young); and became the only quarterback in Ohio State history to throw five touchdowns against a Big Ten competitor four times in one season. He led the team to a 10-2 record in the regular season, with losses to Oregon and bitter rival Michigan. The loss to Michigan cost OSU the chance to play in the Big 10 Championship. Ohio State bounced back from this disappointment at the Rose Bowl; coming back from a 14-point deficit against Utah to win 48-45. Stroud broke both OSU and Rose Bowl records with 573 yards thrown in the Rose Bowl; he also tied an OSU record and set a Rose Bowl record with 6 touchdown passes.

2022 

Following a successful 2021 season, Stroud entered 2022 as one of the best players in college football, as well as the betting favorite to win the Heisman trophy. On October 8, 2022, Stroud threw 6 touchdown passes against Michigan State, setting a conference record for “most 6 passing touchdown games in a career” (with 3), and passed Justin Fields to move to second place on the Ohio State career passing touchdowns list. Stroud and the Buckeyes once again came up short against rival Michigan in their annual meeting, this time losing at home in Columbus 45-23. Despite the loss, the Buckeyes were selected as the fourth and final team for the College Football Playoff. In the Peach Bowl semifinal against the top seeded Georgia Bulldogs, Stroud would have a strong performance, throwing for 348 yards and 4 touchdowns, but the Buckeyes would fall 42-41, ending their season. At the conclusion of the regular season, he again was named a finalist for the Heisman trophy for his season. He finished third in the voting behind winner Caleb Williams from USC and Max Duggan from TCU. On January 16, 2023, Stroud announced that he would forgo his remaining two years of college eligibility and enter the 2023 NFL Draft.

Statistics

References

External links
 
 Ohio State Buckeyes bio

2001 births
Living people
American football quarterbacks
Ohio State Buckeyes football players
People from Rancho Cucamonga, California
Players of American football from California
Sportspeople from San Bernardino County, California